Farah Naz Talpur, Ph.D. (2007), is a Pakistani chemist, who is active in the fields of analytical chemistry and environmental science; she is an associate professor of the University of Sindh and sub-editor of Pakistan Journal of Analytical and Environmental Chemistry.

Works 
 Talpur, F. N. 2007. Fatty Acid Composition of Ruminant Milk, Meat and Dairy Products of Livestock in Sindh, Pakistan. Ph.D. Thesis / advisor Prof. Dr. Muhammad Iqbal Bhanger, University Sindh, Jamshoro, Pakistan, 194 p.

References

Literature 
 Ritota M., Manzi P. Melamine detection in milk and dairy products: Traditional analytical methods and recent developments // Food Analytical Methods. — 2017. — July (vol. 11, iss. 1). — P. 128–147. — ISSN 1936-9751. — DOI:10.1007/s12161-017-0984-1.
 M. Esteki, J. Simal-Gandara, Z. Shahsavari, S. Zandbaaf, E. Dashtaki, Yvan Vander Heyden. A review on the application of chromatographic methods, coupled to chemometrics, for food authentication // Food Control. — 2018. — November (vol. 93). — P. 165–182. — ISSN 0956-7135. — DOI:10.1016/j.foodcont.2018.06.015.

Web-sources 
 
 

Living people
Pakistani chemists
Academic staff of the University of Sindh
Year of birth missing (living people)